RFM may refer to:

Radio
RFM (French radio station)
RFM (Portuguese radio station)

Other
RFM Corporation, a Philippine food company
RFM (customer value) (recency, frequency, monetary value), a method for analyzing customer value
Macedonian Handball Federation
Right-handed fast medium, a type of bowler in cricket
RFM (chemotherapy), a chemotherapy regimen containing rituximab, fludarabine, and mitoxantrone
 Relative Fat Mass - a health measure related to Body mass index  and Body fat percentage